C. B. Collins was Treasurer of South Dakota.

Biography
Collins was born on October 8, 1861 in Rockbridge, Wisconsin. In 1887, he married Anna M. Smith.

Career
Collins served as Treasurer from 1903 to 1907. Additionally, he was a delegate to the 1900 Republican National Convention.

References

People from Richland County, Wisconsin
State treasurers of South Dakota
South Dakota Republicans
1861 births
Year of death missing